The Carangola River is a river of Minas Gerais and Rio de Janeiro states in southeastern Brazil.

See also
 List of rivers of Minas Gerais

References
 Map from Ministry of Transport
 Rand McNally, The New International Atlas, 1993.

Rivers of Rio de Janeiro (state)
Rivers of Minas Gerais